Kolovery was formerly a station on the Salsette–Trombay Railway. It was dismantled after the rail line closed down in 1934. 
Kolovery Village lies in the Kalina area of Santacruz (east).

References

Defunct railway stations in Mumbai